Gavrilovka is a rural locality (a village) in Fyodorovsky Selsoviet, Fyodorovsky District, Bashkortostan, Russia. The population was 21 as of 2010.

Geography 
Gavrilovka is located 39 km east of Fyodorovka (the district's administrative centre) by road. Verkhny Allaguvat is the nearest rural locality.

References 

Rural localities in Fyodorovsky District